"She Runs Away" is the second of three singles released on the debut album by American singer-songwriter Duncan Sheik.

Track listings and formats
 CD single
 "She Runs Away" (Remix) – 3:38
 "Fake Plastic Trees"  – 5:48
 "View from the Other Side"  – 5:56

Charts

References

External links

Duncan Sheik songs
1997 singles
1996 songs
Songs written by Duncan Sheik
Song recordings produced by Rupert Hine
Atlantic Records singles